"Six" is a song by the English alternative rock band Mansun. The song was written by band-leader Paul Draper. It was recorded and produced by Paul Draper and Mark 'Spike' Stent with additional production by Mike Hunter during sessions for the group's second studio album.

The song was re-recorded with New York producer Arthur Baker in a simpler arrangement produced and mixed by Baker and released as the fourth and final single in early 1999 from the group's second album, Six. The Baker version charted better than its predecessor in the typically quiet post-Christmas singles market returning the group to the top twenty in the UK peaking at #16. The single version of "Six" has none of the experimental rock sound that is representative of the parent album as a whole. In the US, Baker's single version appears in place of the album version on Epic Records' truncated version of Six.

The music video for "Six" was directed by Grant Gee.

Track listing
All songs written and composed by Paul Draper and Dominic Chad; except where indicated.

Personnel

Mansun
 Dominic Chad – Lead Guitar, Backing Vocals
 Paul Draper – Lead Vocals, Rhythm Guitar
 Andie Rathbone – Drums
 Stove – Bass

Production
Paul Draper and Mark 'Spike' Stent – producer ("Six" (Album version))
Arthur Baker - producer, mixing ("Six" (Single version))
Mike Hunter – engineer ("Church of the Drive Thru Elvis", "But the Trains Run On Time")
Ian Grimble - engineer ("What It's Like to Be Hated"), mixing (all tracks except "Six" (both versions))
Yosuke Komatsu - photography

Chart positions

References

1999 singles
Mansun songs
Songs written by Paul Draper (musician)
1998 songs
Song recordings produced by Spike Stent
Song recordings produced by Arthur Baker (musician)
Parlophone singles